Garry Paul Nelson (born 16 January 1961) is an English former professional footballer who played as a striker or left winger in the Football League for Southend United, Swindon Town, Plymouth Argyle, Brighton & Hove Albion, Charlton Athletic and Torquay United (as player/assistant manager) between 1979 and 1997. He was voted into Plymouth Argyle's Team of the Century.

Background and Writing
Nelson passed eight 'O' Levels and 3 'A' Levels (French, Geography and Geology) and had the chance to attend Loughborough University but accepted the offer of a professional contract at Southend instead. Nelson also wrote two memoirs about his professional career, Left Foot Forward and Left Foot in the Grave. The books are written in diary form, chronicling a season with Charlton (1994–95) and Torquay (1996–97) respectively. The books have been generally well received, and noted as showing the real life of "ordinary" professional footballers, became best-sellers, and each was shortlisted for the William Hill Sports Book of the Year award.

Career after retirement
After retiring from the game in 1997, Nelson became commercial executive of the Professional Footballers' Association. In 2018, he was still playing football, regularly turning out for Chapel United in the Southend Borough Combination Veterans League and Charlton Athletic veterans.

Honours
Individual
PFA Team of the Year: 1987–88 Third Division

References

External links
 
 
 Interview with Garry Nelson at The Ball is Round

1961 births
Living people
People from Braintree, Essex
English footballers
Association football forwards
Southend United F.C. players
Swindon Town F.C. players
Plymouth Argyle F.C. players
Brighton & Hove Albion F.C. players
Notts County F.C. players
Charlton Athletic F.C. players
Torquay United F.C. players
English Football League players
English non-fiction writers
English male non-fiction writers